Susanne Wigene (born 12 February 1978 in Haugesund) is a Norwegian middle and long distance runner who specializes in the 5000 and 10,000 metres. She also competes over the 1500, 3000 and 3000 m steeplechase distances.

She won the silver medal over 10 000 m at the 2006 European Championships in Athletics in Gothenburg, Sweden in 30:32,26 minutes, thus improving her personal best by well over 2 minutes. She also finished 7th in the 5,000m at the same event.

She has competed for the clubs Haugesund IL, IL Runar, SK Vidar and IK Tjalve. In IK Tjalve she is coached by Knut Kvalheim.

Personal bests
According to IAAF Biography 

1500 metres – 4:13.01 min (Florø, June 4, 2005)
3000 metres – 8:40.23 min (Zürich, August 19, 2005)
5000 metres – 14.48,53 min (Brussels, August 26, 2005)
10 000 metres – 30.32,36 min (Ullevi, August 7, 2006)
3000 metres Steeplechase – 9.45,21 min (Königs Wusterhausen, September 10, 2004)

References

1978 births
Living people
People from Haugesund
Norwegian female long-distance runners
European Athletics Championships medalists
Norwegian schoolteachers
Norwegian female steeplechase runners
Norwegian female middle-distance runners
Sportspeople from Rogaland
20th-century Norwegian women
21st-century Norwegian women